Kaloyan Toshkov Ivanov (born March 18, 1986) is a Bulgarian professional basketball player for Levski Sofia of the NBL.

Professional career 
From 2006 to 2009, Ivanov played with ViveMenorca. On August 4, 2009, he signed a one-year deal with Bàsquet Manresa.

On July 20, 2010 he signed a two-year deal with Spanish club Cajasol Sevilla. On May 25, 2011, he opted out of contract with Sevilla. On August 13, 2011 he signed a two-year contract with Lucentum Alicante. After one season he left Alicante, and signed with Ukrainian club Donetsk. On December 20, 2012, he left Donetsk and signed with Italian club Sidigas Avellino for the rest of the season. On August 7, 2013, he re-signed with Avellino for one more season.

On September 8, 2014, he signed with Andorra of the Liga ACB. On January 26, 2015, he left Andorra and signed with Trabzonspor of the Turkish Basketball League. On July 1, 2015, he left Trabzonspor and signed a two-year deal with Tofaş. On August 17, 2017, he signed with Socar Petkim of the Turkish Basketball First League.

He is Dejan Ivanov's twin brother.

Honors 
  Junior National Team honors
European under 20 Champion -  2005 (Bulgaria)

References

External links 

 Kaloyan Ivanov at acb.com 
 Kaloyan Ivanov at eurobasket.com
 Kaloyan Ivanon at fiba.com

1986 births
Living people
Bàsquet Manresa players
BC Andorra players
Expatriate basketball people in Andorra
BC Avtodor Saratov players
BC Donetsk players
BC Levski Sofia players
Bulgarian expatriate basketball people in Spain
Bulgarian men's basketball players
CB Lucentum Alicante players
Liga ACB players
Menorca Bàsquet players
Petkim Spor players
Power forwards (basketball)
Real Betis Baloncesto players
S.S. Felice Scandone players
Small forwards
Sportspeople from Varna, Bulgaria
Tofaş S.K. players
Trabzonspor B.K. players
Bulgarian twins
Twin sportspeople